Mukarram Talabani (born 1925) is an Iraqi Kurdish politician and former government minister in Ba'athist Iraq. He was born in Kirkuk.

After studying law in Baghdad, Talabani worked as a lawyer from 1946 onwards but was imprisoned from 1948 to 1955 and was only able to return to his work as an attorney after the overthrow of the Iraqi monarchy. Under the Iraqi government of Abd al-Karim Qasim, he became head of the state tobacco company in 1959 and later inspector of the Ministry of Agrarian Reform. Originally a supporter of the Kurdish Democratic Party (KDP), he later broke with KDP leader Mustafa Barzani in 1963, after helping to overthrow the Qasim regime in 1963. He then joined the Iraqi Communist Party (ICP) and became a member of its Central Committee.

When the ICP joined the Ba'athist-led National Progressive Front (NPF), Talabani became Iraq's Minister of Irrigation from 1972 to 1977 and then Iraq's Minister of Transport. With the departure of the Communists from the NPF, Talabani lost his position in 1978 but stayed in Baghdad until 2004. After that he moved to Kurdish autonomous area in Iraq.

References

1925 births
Government ministers of Iraq
Iraqi Communist Party politicians
Iraqi Kurdistani politicians
Possibly living people
People from Kirkuk